Galhard de Carceribus  (died 30 May 1348) was a papal legate, bishop of Veszprém (appointed on 2 March 1345), and archbishop of Brindisi (from 19 July 1346 to his death in 1348).

He was born in the Diocese of Cahors. During 1335 to 1343 he visited Poland as a papal legate, to solve the conflict between Poland and the State of the Teutonic Order. He also collected Peter's Pence payment and composed a list of Polish parishes. He died on 30 May 1348 in Nîmes, France.

References

Bibliography

External links 
 GALHARD de Carceribus (in Hungarian)

1348 deaths
Year of birth unknown

Diplomats of the Holy See

Bishops of Veszprém
Roman Catholic archbishops of Brindisi
Papal legates to Hungary